HMCS Discovery is a Royal Canadian Navy Reserve division and shore facility based in Vancouver, British Columbia, Canada. Created during World War II from the Vancouver Half Company of the Royal Naval Canadian Volunteer Reserve, Discovery was used for recruitment and training, and provided almost 8,000 personnel during the war. Discovery continued in its training role following the war, and also serves as headquarters for several Reserve and Cadet units.

Originally based at the Stanley Park Barracks, in 1944 Discovery moved to its current location on Deadman's Island, in Coal Harbour, adjacent to Stanley Park.

History

World wars
Discovery traces its history to the creation of the "Number 2 (Vancouver) Company" of the Royal Naval Canadian Volunteer Reserve at the beginning of the First World War. This small group was composed of 87 members of the Royal Vancouver Yacht Club who served and were demobilized at the end of the war. It was not until May 1924 that Lieutenant-Commander J.W. Hobbs was given permission to form the first "Vancouver Half Company" of the Naval Volunteer Reserve. Robert Louis Stevenson's schooner Casco was used for a time to train cadets in the 1920s.

During the Second World War, the role of the reserves increased, reflecting the need to maintain sufficient manpower for the war effort. On 1 November 1941, the division was newly commissioned as HMCS Discovery and it moved into Stanley Park Barracks. In 1944, the unit was permitted to occupy Deadman Island in Stanley Park and turn this property into a training facility. During the Second World War, Discovery was one of the greatest sources of naval recruits in Canada, having enrolled 372 officers, 6,974 ratings and 650 Wrens (Women's Royal Canadian Naval Service – WRCNS). Of those, 61 were killed in action. At the end of the war, Discovery became the discharge centre for the whole of the British Columbia mainland, and 8,378 men and women were discharged through the base.

Modern era
HMCS Discovery continues to serve as a training facility, force-generating personnel for Canadian Armed Forces (CAF) operations. Discovery personnel have been deployed to Korea, the Persian Gulf, Egypt, Bosnia and Afghanistan. The facility provided support for the 1997 APEC meeting in Vancouver. It was the Olympic Maritime Operations Centre for the 2010 Winter Olympics and conducted port-security around the country.

It is also the site of the Western Region Diving Centre, coordinating the efforts of the various port inspection diving teams at Naval Reserve Divisions in Western Canada. The unit continues to serve as host and ambassador to dozens of foreign vessels visiting the Port of Vancouver.

In addition to the Naval Reserve, Discovery houses Royal Canadian Sea Cadet Corps Captain Vancouver and Navy League Cadet Corps Captain Rankin. Discovery is also the site of the Naval Museum of Vancouver and Vancouver Naval Veterans Association.

Badge

It was suggested by Sir Arthur W. Cochran, KCVO, Clarenceaux King of Arms that the badge of HMCS Discovery take the form of a rebus. It depicts a gold disc on top of a shake-fork that looks like the letter Y; a "disc over Y".

References

External links 
 HMCS Discovery - official site

Canadian Forces Naval Reserve
Military units and formations of Canada in World War II
Stanley Park